The Horse Boy is the title of an autobiographical book and a documentary feature film that follow the quest of Rupert Isaacson and his wife, Kristen Neff, to find healing for their autistic son, Rowan, after discovering that Rowan's condition appears to be improved by contact with horses. The family leave their home in Texas on an arduous journey to Mongolia.

Book
The Horse Boy: A Father's Quest to Heal His Son, a book about the Isaacsons' experience and written by Rupert Isaacson, was released by Little Brown and Company on April 14, 2009. The book  was a New York Times Best-seller.

Film
The film was directed by Michel Orion Scott and is distributed by Zeitgeist Films. It was nominated for the Grand Jury Prize at the 2009 Sundance Film Festival, and won the 2009 Feature Film Audience Award for the Lone Star States at South by Southwest.

See also
List of films about Autism
Autism spectrum disorders in the media
Autism: The Musical
Dad's in Heaven with Nixon
Recovered: Journeys Through the Autism Spectrum and Back

References

External links
 
 
 An article about the book in The New York Times
 An article about the film in The Wall Street Journal

2009 films
2009 documentary films
American documentary films
British documentary films
Environmental films
Documentary films about children with disability
Documentary films about autism
Films about horses
Films shot in China
2000s English-language films
2000s American films
2000s British films
Films about disability